Jonesville is a rural unincorporated community in eastern Harrison County, Texas, United States. The community is located just west of Waskom, or about 20 miles east of the county seat, Marshall.

Notable people
 J. Waskom Pickett, Methodist bishop
 T. Wayland Vaughan, geologist

Notes

Unincorporated communities in Texas
Unincorporated communities in Harrison County, Texas